The Barbados Workers' Union is a trade union in Barbados.

History
The union was established in October 1941. It has 25,000 members and represents them directly, negotiating with individual companies in each sector. Its membership covers all areas of employment in Barbados: Agriculture, Tourism and Restaurant Services, Transport (Road, Sea and Air), Government and Statutory Boards, Banking and Insurance, Manufacturing and Industry, Construction, Commerce and General Services.

The Barbados Workers' Union Labour College, the residential educational arm of the BWU was opened on 20 September 1974.

General Secretaries
1941: Hugh Worrell Springer
1948: Frank Leslie Walcott
1992: Roy Trotman
2014: Toni Moore

See also

List of trade unions

References

External links
www.bwu-bb.org Official site.

Trade unions in Barbados
International Trade Union Confederation
Caribbean Congress of Labour
Barbados in World War II
Trade unions established in 1941